John Mangan (born 1949/50) is an Irish cyclist. He won the Rás Tailteann in 1972.

Early life
Mangan is a native of Killorglin.

Career

In 1968 Mangan won the Junior Men's event at the Irish National Cycling Championships.

Mangan took part in the ongoing struggle between the National Cycling Association (NCA) and Cumann Rothaíochta na hÉireann for the right to represent Ireland in international competition, participating in an attempt to infiltrate a team into the 1972 Olympic road race event. He pulled Noel Teggart from his bike in the individual road race, inspiring universal condemnation.

He participated in many events in France, winning 156 continental races.

Mangan suffered a skull fracture in 1983 and retired the following year.

Personal and later life
Mangan is an avid hunter, having a licence to cull sika deer in Kerry. He lost part of his hip in a shooting accident.

References

=

Irish male cyclists
Rás Tailteann winners
Sportspeople from County Kerry
Living people
Year of birth missing (living people)